Simley High School is a public high school in Inver Grove Heights, Minnesota, United States. The school opened in 1960 with a graduating class of 19 students. The school, in 2022, has approximately 1,200 students enrolled in grades 912. As of the 2022-23 school year Gerald Sakala is the principle.

The school is a member of Independent School District 199 (Inver Grove Schools), the Minnesota State High School League (MSHSL) and the Metro East Conference. For the last five years, Simley High School has been recognized by the Washington Post as one of the Nation's Best High Schools.

Simley High School was named for I.T. Simley, the retired Superintendent of Schools from South St. Paul, Minnesota, who was a consultant to Inver Grove Heights during the district’s transition years.

The school year is divided into three trimesters that are each twelve weeks long. To be eligible for graduation from Simley High School, a student must earn 66 trimester credits in grades .

Academic performance

The Washington Post and Newsweek rankings
The Washington Post ranked Simley High School as the 14th-most challenging high school in Minnesota and one of the top 100 in the Midwest. Newsweek named Simley the 24th-best high school in Minnesota.

2013 Team Academic All-State Gold Award
Simley's girls' track and field team received an Academic All-State gold award from the Minnesota High School Track Coaches Association with a cumulative 3.961 grade-point average. It was the third year in a row that the girls' track team has received the gold award.

2013 Team Academic All-State Gold Award
Simley's gymnastics team received an Academic All-State gold award from the Minnesota Girls' Gymnastics Coaches Association and its wrestling team received an Academic All-State gold award from the Minnesota Wrestling Coaches Association.

2013 Team Academic All-State Silver Award
Simley's boys' basketball team received an Academic All-State silver award from the Minnesota Basketball Coaches Association.

2012 National AP Scholars
Granted to students in the United States who received an average grade of at least 4 on all AP exams taken, and grades of 4 or higher on eight or more of these exams.
 Aleczander Hartung
 Kristen Jung

2012 AP Scholars with Distinction - Granted to students who receive an average grade of at least 3.5 on all AP exams taken, and grades of 3 or higher on five or more of these exams. 22 students.

2012 AP Scholars with Honor
Granted to students who receive an average grade of at least 3.25 on all AP exams taken, and grades of 3 or higher on four or more of these exams. 26 students achieved AP Scholar with Honor status in 2012.

2012 AP Scholars
Granted to students who receive grades of 3 or higher on three or more AP exams. 43 students achieved AP Scholar status in 2012.

2012 TIES Exceptional Teachers
Awarded to Ron Haala, high school mathematics, and Lori Haak, high school science.

Demographics

In 2017, 60.4% of students were white, 22.0% of students were Hispanic, 0.9% of students were black, 0.3% of students were Asian and 0.1% of students were American Indian.

Sports

American football:  The 2022 football team won the AAAA Minnesota Prep Bowl Championship defeating Hutchinson 34-24.

Baseball: The 2014 baseball team finished with an 11-9 record. It did not make it into the section tournament. Anthony Poole led the team in strikeouts.

Boys' basketball: In the 2014-15 season, the boys' varsity basketball team finished with a final record of 18 wins and 8 losses. Its last game of the season was against Saint Paul Johnson in the Section 4AAA semifinals. The Spartans triumphant run ended with a 93-65 loss with a great effort by Jack Stensgard with 18 points and double figures by others.

Dance: Members of the B-squad, junior varsity and varsity dance teams are dancers from seventh and eighth grade students of Inver Grove Heights Middle School and freshman, sophomores, juniors and seniors of Simley. In the 2014-2015 season, the Simley varsity dance team was second in kick and first in jazz in the section tournament. In the Minnesota State Tournament, they were eighth and ninth respectively.

Golf: The golf team had two participants in the state tournament last year, senior Nick Battis and junior Aaron Leafgren. Mitch Vogel, a senior, was lucky enough to score an ace during a tryout round at Inverwood Golf Course on the par 3 sixth hole.

Boys' hockey: The Spartans play at the Veteran's Memorial Community Center. They are in the Metro East Conference and compete in Section 4A. The Spartans have made multi-section final appearances (most recently during the 2017-18 season) and two state tournament appearances in 1996 and 2003.

Wrestling: The Spartans have won the state championship under Will Short more than four times since 2000, including 2015.

Extra-curricular activities
Extra-curricular activities include First Robotics Team, Math Team, Simley Theatre Guild, Yearbook, German Club, Simley Marching Band, International Club, National Honors Society and Spanish Club.

Conference
Simley High School joined a new conference in the 2014-2015 school year, The Metro East Conference. It joined this conference after the Classic Suburban Conference dissolved. The other schools include Hastings High School, Henry Sibley High School, Hill-Murray School, Mahtomedi High School, North High School, South Saint Paul Secondary and Tartan Senior High School.

References

Public high schools in Minnesota
Schools in Dakota County, Minnesota
Educational institutions established in 1961
1961 establishments in Minnesota